John Gruffith was Dean of St Asaph from 1556 until his death in 1557.
He was also Treasurer of Llandaff and a Canon of Salisbury.

References 

16th-century Welsh Anglican priests
Deans of St Asaph
1557 deaths